The 2022 SAFF U-18 Women's Championship was the third edition of the SAFF U-18 Women's Championship, an international football competition for women's under–18 national teams organized by SAFF. The tournament was held from 15 to 25 March 2022 in Jamshedpur, India.

India won the title of the SAFF U–18 Women's Championship 2022 after finishing on the top table with nine points and with a superior goal difference over Bangladesh.

Host selection 
On 15 December 2021, AIFF declared to be the host of the tournament.

Venue
All matches were held in Jamshedpur, Jharkhand, India.

Participating nations

Match officials
 Choden Kizang
 Om Choki
 Yapa Appuhamilage Pabasara Minisarani

Players eligibility
Players born on or after 1 January 2004 are eligible to compete in the tournament. Each team has to register a squad of minimum 16 players and maximum 23 players, minimum two of whom must be goalkeepers.

Group stage

League table

Matches

Winners

Awards
The following awards were given at the conclusion of the tournament:

Statistics

Goalscorers

See also
2022 SAFF U-20 Championship
2022 SAFF Women's Championship
2022 SAFF U-17 Championship

References

External links
Official website

2022
2022 in women's association football
2022 in Asian football
2022 in youth association football
March 2022 sports events in India